The Embassy of Colombia in Lima is the diplomatic mission of the Republic of Colombia to the Republic of Peru; it is headed by the Ambassador of Colombia to Peru. It is located in the San Isidro district of Lima, precisely at Avenida Jorge Basadre Grohmann 1580 at the intersection of Los Eucaliptos.

The Embassy is charged with representing the interests of the President and Government of Colombia, improving diplomatic relations between Colombia and the accredited countries, promoting and improving the image and standing of Colombia in the accredited nations, promoting the Culture of Colombia, encouraging and facilitating tourism to and from Colombia, and ensuring the safety of Colombians abroad.

In 1948, Ambassador Carlos Echeverri Cortés drew the wrath of President Manuel Arturo Odría Amoretti and his administration when he gave political asylum to Víctor Raúl Haya de la Torre in the Embassy. For five years the Government mounted a military blockade around the Colombian Embassy where Haya was housed, and harassed embassy staff and personnel, because the Colombian Government refuse to give Haya up and the Peruvian Government refused to grant safe conduct for Haya to leave the country.

References

External links
 

Lima
Colombia
Colombia–Peru relations